Inman is an unincorporated community in Fayette County, in the U.S. state of Georgia.

History
A post office called Inman was established in 1887, and remained in operation until 1967. Inman was incorporated as a town in 1911; the town's municipal charter was dissolved at a later date.

References

Former municipalities in Georgia (U.S. state)
Unincorporated communities in Fayette County, Georgia